Mortimer Elwyn Cooley (March 28, 1855 – August 25, 1944) was an American mechanical and consulting engineer, US Naval officer, politician, and Professor of Mechanical Engineering at the University of Michigan, who served as president of the American Society of Mechanical Engineers in 1919–1920.

Biography

Youth, education and early navy career 
Cooley was born in Canandaigua, New York as the son of Albert Blake Colle and Achsah (Griswold) Coole. After the local district schools and the Canandaigua Academy he attended the Naval Academy in Annapolis, Maryland, now the United States Naval Academy, where he graduated in 1878.

In the year 1879–1880 he cruised the North Atlantic on the screw gunboat . In 1880–1881 he was assistant at the Bureau of Steam Engineering in the Navy Department, and in 1881 was appointed Professor of Mechanical Engineering at the University of Michigan, lecturing Steam Engineering and Iron Shipbuilding.

Later career 
After his resignation from the Navy in 1885, he continued working as Professor of at the University of Michigan. Since 1904 he was also Dean of its College of Engineering and Architecture, until his retirement in 1928. Beside his academic career he also continued to work as mechanical and consulting engineer for various military and civil offices.

Cooley was elected fellow of the American Academy of Arts and Sciences,. He served as president of the American Society of Mechanical Engineers in 1919–1920, and also as president of the American Society of Civil Engineers, and the Federated American Engineering Societies, later the American Engineering Council. in 1930 he was awarded the Washington Award.

In 1924, Cooley ran unsuccessfully for a seat in the United States Senate as a Democrat, but lost to incumbent James Couzens.

He was married to Carolyn Elizabeth Moseley.

Selected publications 
 Cooley, Mortimer E. Annual report[s, and Final report] of the Block Singal and Train Control Board to the Interstate Commerce Commission. Washington, Govt. Print. Off., 1909-12.
 Cooley, Mortimer E. Report on proposed Belle Isle bridge by the Consulting board, Bell Isle bridge division of engineering and construction, Department of public works. Detroit, 1918.
 Cooley, C. M. E., and Mortimer Elwyn. The Cooley genealogy, the descendants of Ensign Benjamin Cooley, an early settler of Springfield and Longmeadow, Massachusetts; and other members of the family in America. Rutland VT, The Tuttle Pub. Co (1940).
  Mortimer E. Cooley & Vivien B. Keatley. Scientific blacksmith, by Mortimer E. Cooley, with the assistance of Vivien B. Keatley. Ann Arbor, Univ. of Michigan Press, 1947.

References

External links 
 Mortimer Elwyn Cooley, University of Michigan
 Mortimer Elwyn Cooley, University of Michigan library
 MDOT - Cooley, Mortimer E. (1855-1944), State of Michigan

1855 births
1944 deaths
American mechanical engineers
19th-century American inventors
20th-century American inventors
American non-fiction writers
United States Naval Academy alumni
University of Michigan faculty
Fellows of the American Academy of Arts and Sciences
People from Canandaigua, New York
Presidents of the American Society of Mechanical Engineers
Engineers from New York (state)